Lynn Scarff is an Irish science communication specialist, museum curator, and former teacher. Since May 2018, she has served as Director of the National Museum of Ireland. Her appointment had been announced in January 2018, in succession to Raghnall Ó Floinn. She had previously worked at the Science Gallery Dublin (part of Trinity College, Dublin) as its education and outreach manager, before serving as its Director from 2014 to 2018.

References

Science communicators
People associated with Trinity College Dublin
Museum directors
Women museum directors
Irish curators
Women educators
Irish educators
People associated with the National Museum of Ireland
Living people
Year of birth missing (living people)
Irish women curators